Elliot James Langridge (born 5 September 1987) is an English actor, known for the lead roles in Northern Soul (2014), and Raindance Best UK Feature Film, We the Kings (2019).

Personal life
Born in Kingston upon Thames, England, Langridge struggled with dyslexia.

Filmography

Television

References

External links
Elliot James Langridge profile at Revolution Talent

English actors
Living people
English male television actors
1987 births